Austin is an Indian politician and Member of the Legislative Assembly. He is elected to the Tamil Nadu legislative assembly as a Dravida Munnetra Kazhagam candidate from Kanyakumari constituency in 2016 election.

References 

Living people
Year of birth missing (living people)
Place of birth missing (living people)
Dravida Munnetra Kazhagam politicians
Tamil Nadu MLAs 2016–2021
All India Anna Dravida Munnetra Kazhagam politicians